Sharad may refer to:
 Sharad (season), an Indian season
 SHARAD, a Mars probe unit


People with the name

Politics
 Sharad Pawar – President of the Nationalist Congress Party
 Sharad Singh Bhandari – Nepalese politician
 Sharad Bansode – Indian politician
 Sharad Anantrao Joshi – Member of the Parliament of India representing Maharashtra in the Rajya Sabha
 Sharad Yadav – Politician
 Sharad Kumar Awasthi – former MLA from Ram Nagar
 Sharad Tripathi – Member of the Bharatiya Janata Party (9 January 1972 – 30 June 2021)
 Sharad Ranpise – Member of the Indian National Congress.
 Sharad Dighe – former member of the Indian National Congress from the Bombay North Central (1924–2002)

Film and Television
Sharad Kapoor – Indian actor
 Sharad Talwalkar – Indian Marathi language film and television actor
 Sharad Vyas – Television actor
 Sharad Ponkshe – Indian actor and writer
 Sharad Sharma – Indian cartoonist
 Sharad Kelkar – Indian actor
 Sharad Gogate – Marathi publisher and writer
 Sharad Haskar – Photographer
 Sharad Malhotra – Indian film and television actor
 Sharad Joshi – Indian poet, writer, satirist and a dialogue and scriptwriter in Hindi films and television (1931–1991)

Law and order
 Sharad Arvind Bobde – 47 Chief Justice of India
 Sharad Kumar – former Indian Police Service (IPS) officer

Medicine
 Sharad Panday –  Indian heart surgeon
 Sharad Vaidya – Indian surgeon
 Sharad Kumar Dixit – Indian born American plastic surgeon

Sports
 Sharad Diwadkar – Indian Cricketer
 Sharad Rao – Indian Cricketer
 Sharad Hazare – Indian Cricketer (1945–2022)
 Sharad Kumar  – Indian Paralympic high jumper
 Sharad Vesawkar – Nepalese Cricketer

Entrepreneur
 Sharad Devarajan – CEO of Gotham Comics
 Sharad Sagar – Indian social entrepreneur and the Founder and CEO of Dexterity Global

See also 
 Sharada (disambiguation)
 Sharat (disambiguation)